In 1945 the Geographical Names Board of Canada began a program to name previously unofficially named features after casualties from all three branches of the Canadian armed forces.  With around 100,000 lakes, most without names, Manitoba has been an enthusiastic adopter of the program.  In 1995 the project to commemorate the 4,000 Manitoba casualties from the Second World War by naming lakes, islands and bays after them was completed.

The province has had a full-time toponymist since 1971 to manage the naming of its geography.  Locations are researched to ensure that names with long-standing local use take precedence and only then given a commemorative name randomly.  Since 1995 the province has been commemorating casualties from World War I, the Korean War, Afghanistan and U.N. peacekeeping missions.

Early names

In July 1947, the province of Manitoba, Canada, named 25 lakes after 26 men who lost their lives on active service in the Second World War.

These were:
Mackie Lake, named after FO. A. M. Mackie of Winnipeg.
McMillan Lake, named after FO. L. McMillan.
Vandekerckhove Lake, named after PO. G. P. C. Vandekerckchove, of Stony Mountain.
Arbour Lake, named after WO. Abram Arbour.
Tenklei Lake, named after Sgt. Edward Stanley Tenklei.
Suttie Lake, named after Capt. James M. Suttie.
Craig Lake, named after FO. J. Craig, of Winnipeg.
Chepil Lake, named after WO. M. Chepil, of Winnipeg.
Dunphy Lake, named after FL. R. J. Dunphy, of Winnipeg.
Wilmot Lake, named after SL. B. E. Wilmot.
Counsell Lake, named after Major R. R. Counsell.
Story Lake, named after Lance-Cpl. Rupert R. Story.
Two Tod Lake, named after twin brothers Douglas Tod and WO. Ernest Tod.
Eager Lake, named after FO. W. H. Eager.
McGavock Lake, named after FO. J. J. McGavock, of Winnipeg.
Hunter Lake, named after Pte. Jack Hunter, of Neepewa.
Finch Lake, named after SL. G. H. Finch, of Birtle.
Matheson Lake, named after Lieut. Donald John Matheson.
Kadeniuk Lake, named after Pte. Walter Kadeniuk, of Winnipeg.
Dobbyn Lake, named after FO. J. L. Dobbyn, of Dand. 
Watt Lake, named after FO. R. H. Watt, of Winnipeg.
Runner Lake, named after PO. J. M. Runner, of Treherne.
McCallum Lake, named after Major Douglas H. McCallum.
Reid Lake, named after Lieut. Edward James Reid, of Souris.
Van Hende Lake, named after Sgt. Marcel O. Van Hende.

There are more than 4,200 lakes, islands, bays and other geographical features named after Manitoba's war dead.

External links
Copy of Winnipeg Free Press article from 14 July 1947 listing the names of the 25 Manitoba Memorial Lakes
A Place of Honour - Lists the 4,200 lakes, islands, bays and other geographical features named after Manitoba's war dead.
The Perplexing Problem of Manitoba’s Nameless Lakes
Where the lakes have no names

Lakes of Manitoba